Vermuth may refer to:
 Vermouth, aromatized fortified wine
 Gil Vermuth, Israeli footballer